Rayo Vallecano Femenino is the women's football section of Madrid-based club Rayo Vallecano, currently playing in the Primera Federación. Between 2008 and 2011 it won three national championships and one national cup.

History
Rayo Vallecano established its women's team in 2000, absorbing local club CD El Buen Retiro. In 2003 it earned promotion to the top league, and after two seasons in mid-table it established itself in the top positions from 2006. The team's golden era started in 2008, winning the national cup and narrowly missing a double, with Levante UD winning the championship on goal average.

This first trophy was followed by three championships in a row until 2011, becoming the second team to achieve this after Athletic Bilbao. Rayo Vallecano thus took part in the first three editions of the UEFA Women's Champions League after its relaunch in 2010. In its debut Rayo was knocked out in the first round by WFC Rossiyanka, while both in 2011 and 2012 it was defeated by Arsenal FC in the Round of 16 after overcoming Valur and PK-35 respectively.

Following the 2011 season the team had to cut down its budget, and it couldn't fight for the title in the next two seasons. In 2013 it was sixth, its worst result since 2005. In 2022, they relegated to Primera Federación for the first time after spending 19 years on the top league.

Honours

Titles

Official
 Spanish women's football championship (3): 
 2009, 2010, 2011
 Spanish women's cup (1): 
 2008

Invitational
 Pyrénées Cup (1):
 2009

Season by season

UEFA competition record

Players

Current squad

Former internationals

  Spain: Maripaz Azagra, Saray García, Sonia Bermúdez, Vanesa Gimbert, Jennifer Hermoso, Alexandra López, Adriana Martín, Melisa Nicolau, Natalia Pablos, Willy Romero, Cristina Vega, Sandra Vilanova
  Argentina: Marianela Szymanowski
  Colombia: Nicole Regnier
  Equatorial Guinea: Jade Boho
  Guatemala: Ana Lucía Martínez
  Serbia: Jelena Čubrilo
  Venezuela: Oriana Altuve
  Brazil: Milene Domingues
  Gibraltar: Charlyann Pizzarello

References

External links
 Team roster
 Club at uefa.com

Women's football clubs in Spain
Rayo Vallecano
2010 establishments in Spain
Primera División (women) clubs
Football clubs in Madrid
Primera Federación (women) clubs